Lethal Enforcers II: Gun Fighters, known in Japan as  is a 1994 light gun shooter arcade game and prequel to the original Lethal Enforcers. In contrast with the first game's modern law enforcement theme, Lethal Enforcers II takes place in the American Old West.

Ports of the game were released for the Genesis and Sega CD. The game was bundled along with the first Lethal Enforcers game as part of the PlayStation compilation Lethal Enforcers I & II. A Super NES version of the game was also announced that same year, but was unreleased.

Years later, Konami released Lethal Enforcers 3.

Gameplay
In this game, the goal is to shoot outlaws in order to eradicate crime from a stereotypical town in the American West of 1873. At the beginning of the game, three to five life units are available. In the arcade version, more can be purchased by inserting additional coins. Life units are also awarded based on how many points the player scores while playing the game. Every time the player, an innocent civilian or lawman is shot, one life unit will be lost. The game overs when all life units are gone, but continued play is available.

Lethal Enforcers 2 has five stages: "The Bank Robbery", "The Stage-Holdup", "Saloon Showdown", "The Train Robbery", and "The Hide-Out". During each stage, the player must shoot the armed outlaws without harming any innocent townsfolk or fellow lawmen. One shot is enough to kill most enemies. Each stage features a boss that must be killed in order to complete the stage (though a unique case happened in the third stage where the boss battle is in the form of a dueling mini-game). Just like the original game, a dip switch setting in the arcade version allows operators to let players progress through the stages in a linear fashion ("arcade mode") or select individual stages ("street mode"), including the between level target practice stages.

Weapons
The player begins with a revolver that can hold six rounds. To reload, the player must aim the light gun away from the screen and pull the trigger. Additional weaponry can be found throughout the game that will give the player better firepower: .50 caliber Sharps rifles, higher-capacity rifles, double rigs, shotguns, Gatling guns, and cannons. The Gatling guns and cannons can each be used only once but the other four weapons can be reloaded the same way as the revolver. If a player is shot while holding a more powerful weapon, it is lost and the player reverts to the original revolver.

Ranks
There are different ranks that the player can attain, depending on how well the player performs. The ranks are: Posse, Deputy, Sheriff, Deputy Marshal and U.S. Marshal. When the game begins, the player's rank is Posse, and after each stage the player will be promoted, provided they have not killed any innocents. If the player has killed innocents on any stage, they will either maintain their rank or will be demoted, although the ranks do not go below Posse. On Sega Genesis and Sega CD port, the accuracy for each stage corresponds to the given rank:

59% or below: Posse
60-69%: Deputy
70-79%: Sheriff
80-89%: Deputy Marshal
90% or above: U.S. Marshal

Reception

In North America, RePlay reported Lethal Enforcers II: Gun Fighters to be the fourth most-popular upright arcade game in May 1994, and Play Meter listed Lethal Enforcers II as the ninth most-popular arcade game in June 1994. In Japan, Game Machine listed Gun Fighters on their November 15, 1994 issue as being the seventh most-successful upright/cockpit arcade unit of the month.

GamePro gave the Genesis version a perfect 5 out of 5 in all four categories (graphics, sound, control, and fun factor), citing the variety of weapons and their individually distinct firing patterns, sharp digitized sprites, realistic backgrounds, and the quality build and accuracy of the Justifier peripheral, which they felt worked better with Lethal Enforcers II than with the original game. Electronic Gaming Monthly rated the Genesis version 31 out of 50, commenting positively on the two-player mode and variety of weapons.

GamePro gave the Sega CD version a positive review as well, saying that it is generally identical to the Genesis version but has more voices. Electronic Gaming Monthly rated it 33 out of 50, commenting that it has better music and sound effects than the Genesis version, but that the game is far more difficult than the first Lethal Enforcers. Next Generation rated it three stars out of five, and stated that "the graphics aren't good [...] but it's more challenging, since many more of the targets move this time. If you liked it once, you'll like it again".

Notes

References

External links
Lethal Enforcers II: Gunfighters (Genesis version) at GameFAQs
Lethal Enforcers II: Gunfighters (Sega CD version) at GameFAQs
Lethal Enforcers II: Gunfighters (Arcade version) at GameFAQs

1994 video games
Arcade video games
Konami games
Sega Genesis games
Sega CD games
Lethal Enforcers
Video games set in the United States
Western (genre) video games
Light gun games
PlayStation (console) games
Video game prequels
Video games about police officers
Video games with digitized sprites
Video games scored by Tsuyoshi Sekito
Konami arcade games
Video games developed in Japan